Vigneaux may refer to:

 Château du Vigneau, a former winery in  Bayonne, France
 Château de Rayne-Vigneau, a castle and white wine appellation of Bordeaux, France
  (1892–1968), French photographer, see Robert Doisneau
 Placide Vigneau (1842–?1946), French-Canadian author and lighthouse keeper
 Robert Vigneau (born 1933), French poet

See also
 Vigneaux (disambiguation)